Roberto Tagle (born 30 September 1945) is an Argentine equestrian. He competed at the 1968 Summer Olympics, the 1972 Summer Olympics and the 1976 Summer Olympics.

References

1945 births
Living people
Argentine male equestrians
Olympic equestrians of Argentina
Equestrians at the 1968 Summer Olympics
Equestrians at the 1972 Summer Olympics
Equestrians at the 1976 Summer Olympics
Sportspeople from Córdoba, Argentina